Novem Baumann (born 4 December 1995) is a Swiss professional goalkeeper who plays for 1. Liga Promotion club Young Fellows Juventus.

Career

Youth
Baumann began his career in Switzerland with the youth teams of Urdorf and Oetwil-Geroldswil. In 2006, he joined the youth team of FC Zürich.

Zürich U21
In December 2012, Baumann was promoted to the U21 team of FC Zürich.

Loan to Höngg
In 2013, Baumann was sent out on loan to SV Höngg. He made his debut for the club in a 2-1 win against FC Thalwil.
After his 3-month loan spell, he returned to Zürich. He made a total of 2 appearances for the club.

Loan to Wil
In 2015, Baumann joined Swiss Challenge League club Wil in a 3-month loan deal. Baumann then returned to Zürich. He made 1 appearance for the U20 team.

Zürich seniors
In July 2015, Baumann was promoted to the senior team of Zürich. In 2016 he made his league debut for the club in a 0-2 defeat against his former club Wil.

Loan to Rapperswil-Jona
Baumann was sent on loan to Swiss Challenge League club Rapperswil-Jona. He made his debut for the club in a 2-0 away defeat against Wil. After his loan spell, he returned to Zürich, making a total of 4 appearances for Rapperswil-Jona.

Return to the senior team
Baumann was demoted to the U21 team in February 2019. After playing mostly for the U21 team, Baumann was once again promoted to the senior team replacing outgoing goalkeeper, Osman Hadžikić.

YF Juventus
In June 2021, Baumann's contract with Zürich expired. Baumann then joined 1. Liga Promotion club Young Fellows Juventus.

International career
Born to a Swiss father and a Filipina mother, Baumann is eligible to represent both Switzerland and Philippines at international level.

Switzerland youth
Baumann has represented Switzerland at under-15 to under-20 levels.

Honours

Club

Zürich
Swiss Cup: 2015–16

References

External links

 

1995 births
Living people
Swiss people of Filipino descent
Association football goalkeepers
Swiss men's footballers
Switzerland youth international footballers
FC Zürich players
Swiss Super League players
Footballers from Zürich